Rainier Tower is a 41-story,  skyscraper in the Metropolitan Tract of Seattle, Washington, at 1301 Fifth Avenue. It was designed by Minoru Yamasaki, who designed the World Trade Center in New York City as well as the IBM Building, which is on the corner across the street from Rainier Tower to the southeast. Its construction was completed in 1977.

The skyscraper has an unusual appearance, being built atop an 11-story,  concrete pedestal base that tapers towards ground level, like an inverted pyramid. Architect Yamasaki chose the design in order to preserve the greenery of downtown Seattle and allow more ground space to be devoted to a retail shopping plaza.

Beneath the tower was Rainier Square, an underground shopping mall connecting with One Union Square, which is owned by the University of Washington (UW). This shopping center was demolished in 2017. Both the mall and tower were originally named after Rainier Bank, which was merged in the 1980s into Security Pacific, which was eventually merged into Bank of America. The tower was named after Security Pacific in 1989 until UW chose to rename it back to the more familiar "Rainier Tower" in 1995.

Locals often refer to it as the "Beaver Building" as its physical appearance looks like a tree being felled by a beaver. It had also been referred to as the "golf tee" building.

In 2015, the University of Washington proposed the Rainier Square Tower, an 850 ft mixed-use tower, to occupy space on the same block as the Rainier Tower. Construction began in September 2017, and completed in 2020.

See also
List of tallest buildings in Seattle

References

External links

Rainier Tower at Wright Runstad and Company

Skyscraper office buildings in Seattle
Downtown Seattle
Bank of America buildings
Bank of America legacy banks
NBBJ buildings
Office buildings completed in 1977
Minoru Yamasaki buildings
1977 establishments in Washington (state)